The Washington State Book Awards is a literary awards program presented annually in recognition of notable books written by Washington authors in the previous year. The program was established in 1967 as the Governor's Writers Awards. Each year, up to ten outstanding books of any genre, which have been written by Washington authors in the previous year are recognized with awards based on literary merit, lasting importance, and overall quality of the publication.

History 
When the Governor's Writers Awards was established in 1967, it was based at the Washington State Library in Olympia. In 2001, the Washington Center for the Book based at the Seattle Public Library took over the administration of the program, renaming it as the Washington State Book Awards.

In 2005, an additional category was added to represent children's books. Since established, two children's books are honored each year with the Scandiuzzi Children's Book Awards. One book is honored for picture books, while the other for middle grades and young adults.

In 2006, the Center for the Book divided the entire awards program into categories, significantly reducing the number of awards presented. From 2006 through 2010, the genres of History and Biography formed one category. In 2011, Biography was regrouped with Memoir, while History was regrouped with General Nonfiction. In 2013, the categories encompass General Nonfiction (History), Biography and Memoir, Fiction, Poetry, and two to four Scandiuzzi Children's Books Awards. As of 2020, there are five categories for adults (Fiction, Poetry, Biograph/Memoir, Creative Nonfiction and General Nonfiction) and three categories for books for youth (Picture Books, Books for Young Readers, and Young Adult Literature).

In 2017, the Washington Center for the Book became a joint partnership of the Washington State Library and The Seattle Public Library. The Washington State Book Awards continue as a project for the Center for the Book.

Washington State Book Award winners and finalists

2000s 
Between 2002 and 2004, the award was presented to a group of books rather than to a single winner with a selection of finalists.

In 2005, the Washington State Book Awards were separated into categories, and individual winners were selected.

General Books

Scandiuzzi Children's Book Award

Fiction

General nonfiction

History/Biography

Poetry

2010s

Biography/Memoir

Fiction

General nonfiction

History/Biography

History/General nonfiction

Poetry

Scandiuzzi Children's Book Award

2020s

Biography/Memoir

Creative nonfiction

Fiction

General nonfiction

Picture book

Poetry

Young adult

Young reader

References

External links
 Washington Center for the Book List of Award Winners
 Seattle Times article on 2008 Awards

American poetry awards
Awards established in 1967
American fiction awards